This is a list of neighborhoods in Brooklyn, one of the five boroughs of New York City.

By geographical region

Central Brooklyn
Crown Heights 
Weeksville 
Flatbush 
Beverley Squares: Beverley Square East, Beverley Square West
Ditmas Park 
East Flatbush 
Farragut 
Remsen Village
Fiske Terrace 
Pigtown 
Wingate
Prospect Park area
Prospect Lefferts Gardens 
Prospect Park South 
Windsor Terrace
Kensington
Ocean Parkway
Parkville

Eastern Brooklyn
Brownsville 
Canarsie
East New York 
City Line
Cypress Hills
New Lots
Spring Creek
Starrett City
  Highland Park

Northern Brooklyn
Bedford–Stuyvesant
Bedford
Ocean Hill 
Stuyvesant Heights
Bushwick
Wyckoff Heights
East Williamsburg
Greenpoint
Little Poland
Williamsburg

Northwestern Brooklyn
Brooklyn Heights
Brooklyn Navy Yard
Admiral's Row
Cadman Plaza
Clinton Hill
Downtown Brooklyn
Bridge Plaza/RAMBO
DUMBO
Fulton Ferry
Fort Greene
Prospect Heights
Pacific Park/Atlantic Yards
Vinegar Hill
South Brooklyn – takes its name from the geographical position of the original town of Brooklyn, which today includes the neighborhoods listed above under the heading "northwestern Brooklyn." It is not located in the southern part of the modern borough. 
Boerum Hill
Carroll Gardens
Columbia Street Waterfront District
Cobble Hill
Gowanus
Park Slope
South Park Slope
Greenwood Heights
Red Hook

Southern Brooklyn
Barren Island 
Bergen Beach and Georgetown
Coney Island
Brighton Beach, also known as "Little Odessa" or "Little Russia"
West Brighton
Manhattan Beach
Sea Gate
Sheepshead Bay and Madison
Homecrest 
Midwood
Flatlands
Gerritsen Beach 
Gravesend
White Sands
Marine Park
Mill Basin 
Plumb Beach

Southwestern Brooklyn
The southwestern portion of Brooklyn shares numbered streets and avenues starting from 36th Street to 101st Street and from 1st Avenue to 25th Avenue, passing through the neighborhoods listed below:
Bay Ridge
Fort Hamilton
Bensonhurst
Bath Beach 
New Utrecht
Borough Park
Mapleton lies mostly in Borough Park but its southern reaches are within Bensonhurst
Dyker Heights
Sunset Park
Chinatown

By historical town

The original Dutch settlement of what is now Brooklyn consisted of six towns with clearly defined borders. These later became English settlements, and were consolidated over time until the entirety of Kings County was the unified City of Brooklyn.  The towns were, clockwise from the north: Bushwick, Brooklyn, Flatlands, Gravesend, New Utrecht, with Flatbush in the middle. The modern neighborhoods bearing these names are located roughly in the center of each of these original towns.  Certain portions of the original six towns were also independent municipalities for a time, before being reabsorbed.

Following an 1894 referendum, the entire consolidated City of Brooklyn became a borough of New York City in 1898.

Bushwick
Annexed to Brooklyn in 1854.
Bushwick
Greenpoint
Williamsburg (separated from Bushwick in 1840, annexed to Brooklyn in 1854)

Brooklyn 
Bedford-Stuyvesant
Boerum Hill
Brooklyn Heights
Brownsville
Carroll Gardens
City Line
Clinton Hill
Cobble Hill
Crown Heights
Cypress Hills
Downtown Brooklyn
DUMBO
East New York
Fort Greene
Gowanus
Greenwood Heights
Highland Park
New Lots (separated from Flatbush in 1852, annexed to Brooklyn in 1886)
Ocean Hill
Park Slope
Prospect Heights
RAMBO
Spring Creek
Starrett City
Stuyvesant Heights
Sunset Park
Vinegar Hill
Weeksville
Windsor Terrace
Wingate

Flatlands
Annexed to Brooklyn in 1869.

Bergen Beach
Canarsie
Flatlands
Georgetown
Marine Park
Mill Basin
The southeastern quarter of Midwood

Gravesend

Annexed to Brooklyn in 1894.
Brighton Beach
Coney Island
Gerritsen Beach
Gravesend
Homecrest
Madison
Midwood
Manhattan Beach
Plum Beach
Seagate
Sheepshead Bay

New Utrecht

Annexed to Brooklyn in 1894.
Bay Ridge
Borough Park
Dyker Heights
Mapleton
New Utrecht
Bath Beach
Bensonhurst

Flatbush 

Annexed to Brooklyn in 1894.
Ditmas Park
East Flatbush
Farragut
Fiske Terrace
Flatbush
Kensington
Prospect Lefferts Gardens
Prospect Park South

See also

List of Bronx neighborhoods
List of Manhattan neighborhoods
List of Queens neighborhoods
List of Staten Island neighborhoods

References

External links

Neighborhood Map from NYC Department of City Planning
List of Brooklyn Neighborhood Associations

 
Brooklyn
Brooklyn
Lists of neighborhoods in U.S. cities